Leopold Petazzi de Castel Nuovo (born 1703 in Vienna) was an Austrian clergyman and bishop for the Roman Catholic Archdiocese of Ljubljana. He was ordained in 1726. He was appointed bishop in 1740. He died in 1772.

References 

1703 births
1772 deaths
Austrian Roman Catholic bishops